George Humble may refer to:

Sir George Humble, 3rd Baronet (c. 1670–1703) of the Humble baronets
George Humble, candidate for Carleton
George Bland Humble (1839–1930), Australian town clerk and educator